William Edwin Chilton (March 17, 1858November 7, 1939) was a United States senator from West Virginia. Born in Colesmouth, Virginia (now St. Albans, West Virginia), he attended public and private schools and graduated from Shelton College in St. Albans. He taught school, studied law, and was admitted to the bar in 1880, commencing practice in Charleston, West Virginia in 1882. He also engaged in the newspaper publishing business, and was prosecuting attorney of Kanawha County in 1883. In 1892 he was chairman of the Democratic State executive committee and was Secretary of State of West Virginia from 1893 to 1897.

Chilton was elected as a Democrat to the U.S. Senate and served from March 4, 1911, to March 3, 1917; while in the Senate, he was chairman of the Committee on Census (Sixty-third and Sixty-fourth Congresses) and of the Committee on Printing (Sixty-fourth Congress), and also served on the Senate Judiciary Committee. Chilton's bid for reelection in 1916 failed; he unsuccessfully contested the election of his opponent, Howard Sutherland.

After Chilton's term in the Senate, he resumed the practice of law and the newspaper publishing business in Charleston. He was an unsuccessful candidate for election to the Senate in 1924 and again in 1934. He died in Charleston in 1939; interment was in Teay's Hill Cemetery, St. Albans.

His parents' house at St. Albans, known as the Chilton House, was listed on the National Register of Historic Places in 1977.

Personal life
Chilton didn't use a suffix in his lifetime but was technically William Edwin Chilton Jr., as his parents were William Edwin Chilton (1827–1881) and Mary Elizabeth Wilson Chilton (1831–1918).

On December 19, 1892, he married Mary Louise Tarr (1866–1953) in Washington, D.C. They had four children:
William Edwin Chilton III (1893–1950); because his father never used a suffix, this William was known as William Edwin Chilton Jr.; on June 19, 1920 in Kingston, New York, he married Louise Burt Schoonmaker (1899–1928). 
William Edwin Chilton IV (1921–1987); typically referred to as William III.
Mary Carroll Chilton (1925–1971); married to and divorced from Park Vassar Chapman (1924–1994), a First Lieutenant in the United States Army during World War II and descendant of Matthew Vassar, founder of Vassar College; married secondly James Abbot.
Robert Laurent Chapman (1948-
Park Vassar Chapman Jr. (1953-
Carroll Louise Chapman
Alice Chilton Abbot
Leslie Ann Abbot
Karen Elizabeth Abbot
Joseph Eustace Chilton (1895–1937)
Eleanor Carroll Chilton (1898–1949), novelist and poet
Elizabeth Leigh Chilton (1901–1986); married 1st Girard R. Lowrey (1899–1957) on November 27, 1920 in Manhattan, New York; married 2nd Douglas Murray/Murry.

His wife's niece, Louise Benedict Schoonmaker, married Robert V. Keeley, a United States diplomat.

Career
At the dedication of the capital of West Virginia, Mr. Chilton introduced the speaker to be the founder of Mother's Day, Miss Anna Jarvis. As quoted she stated 
"This beautiful moment and magnificent capitol building is a fitting monument to the sacrifice, the devotion, the industry, and the hopes of West Virginia Mothers. This State has always shown the element of greatness. Today this State honors its homes, and its Mothers as has no other state in this nation. Today for the first time in history the Mothers have a part in the dedication of a great public edifice. It is an honor to every West Virginia home, and a tribute to all Mothers. May we realize that this beautiful building stands for truth, for justice, for integrity, for progress, and for the hopes and ambitions of all West Virginia Mothers."

References

External links
 
 West Virginia Encyclopedia
West Virginia & Regional History Center at West Virginia University, William Edwin Chilton papers

|-

|-

|-

|-

|-

1858 births
1939 deaths
19th-century American lawyers
20th-century American lawyers
19th-century American newspaper publishers (people)
County prosecuting attorneys in West Virginia
Democratic Party United States senators from West Virginia
Lawyers from Charleston, West Virginia
Politicians from Charleston, West Virginia
People from St. Albans, West Virginia
Secretaries of State of West Virginia
West Virginia Democrats
West Virginia lawyers
19th-century American politicians
20th-century American politicians
20th-century American newspaper publishers (people)